The 7486th Air Defense Group is an inactive United States Air Force organization. Its last assignment was with the Twelfth Air Force, being stationed at Landstuhl Air Base, West Germany. It was inactivated on 12 September 1957.

History

Lineage
 Established as 7486th Air Defense Group on 1 May 1954
 Redesignated as 7486th Air Base Group on 1 July 1955
 Inactivated on 12 September 1957

Assignments
 Twelfth Air Force, 1 May 1954 – 12 September 1957

Stations
 Landstuhl AB, West Germany, 1 May 1954 – 12 September 1957

Components
 440th Fighter-Interceptor Squadron, 2 December 1954 – 3 January 1956
 496th Fighter-Interceptor Squadron, 2 December 1954 – 3 January 1956

Operations
Provided Air Defense of Western Europe. Inactivated and units assigned to 86th Fighter-Interceptor Group.

References

External links

Air defense groups of the United States Air Force